The price is the assigned or determined value of a good, service, or asset.

Price may also refer to:

Places
 Price Hill (disambiguation)
 Mount Price (disambiguation)

United States
 Price, Maryland, an unincorporated community
 Price, Texas, an unincorporated community
 Price, Utah, a city
 Price River, Utah
 Price, West Virginia, an unincorporated community
 Price County, Wisconsin
 Price, Wisconsin, a town
 Price, Jackson County, Wisconsin, an unincorporated community
 Price Glacier (Mount Shuksan), North Cascades National Park, Washington
 Price Freeway, a piece of Loop 101 in Metropolitan Phoenix

Elsewhere
 Price, South Australia, Australia, a town and locality
 Price, Quebec, Canada, a village municipality
 Price Town, Wales, a village
 Price Peak, Marie Byrd Land, Antarctica
 Price Glacier (Antarctica)
 Price Island, British Columbia, Canada
 Main Operating Base Price, Helmand Province, Afghanistan, an International Security Assistance Force base

United States and Canada
 Price Township (disambiguation)
 Mount Price (disambiguation)

People
 Price (surname)
 Price (given name)
 W. Price Hunt (1783–1842), an early pioneer of the Pacific Northwest of North America

Buildings
 Price Tower, a building in Bartlesville, Oklahoma
 Édifice Price (Price Building), a skyscraper in Quebec City, Canada
 Price Center, University of California, San Diego, California, a student center
 Price's Mill, South Carolina, a gristmill on the National Register of Historic Places
 Price's Post Office, South Carolina, on the National Register of Historic Places

Businesses
 PRICE Systems, a business within the RCA Corporation
 Price's Candles, a UK manufacturer and retailer of candles founded in 1830
 Mr. Price, South African Retail Store

Other uses
 Price baronets, six titles, two being extant
 One of two variations of RICE (medicine), an acronym for a treatment method for soft tissue injuries: 
 Protection, Rest, Ice, Compression and Elevation, or
 Pulse (Typically Radial or Distal), Rest, Ice, Compression, and Elevation

See also
 The Price (disambiguation)
 Prize (disambiguation)
 Justice Price (disambiguation)